This article lists programs broadcast by ANT1 and on ANT1 Cyprus for international viewers from Greece and Cyprus:

Serials (comedies and dramas)

Length of new episodes from the earliest to the latest are written in brackets.

30 Meres Agonias (2006) - comedy/romance, starring Kostas Koklas, Theofania Papathoma, Hristos Simardanis, Christina Theodoropoulou, Calliope Tahtsoglou, Ioannis Papazisis
 40 Kymata - comedy
 7 Zwes - comedy
A.M.A.N.(1997-2007) - sketch comedy show, very popular in Greece
Agapo Ti... Mama sou (2007) - telemovie, comedy; written by Haris Romas; starring Haris Romas, Betty Livanou, Hristina Matzourani, Agis Emmanouil, Natalia Migdou and Vassilis Koukouras; guest starring Giorgos Ninios; special appearance by Gerasimos Skiadaresis
Agigma Psihis (1998) - drama/romance; directed by Manousos Manousakis; starring Stavros Zalmas, Theofania Papathoma, Elena Nathanail, Petros Fyssoun, Christoforos Papakaliatis, Babis Alatzas, Giannis Voglis, Toni Dimitriou, Katerina Didaskalu, Dimitra Matsouka, Anna Stilvi
Αkros Ikogeniakon (Family Business) (2001–2003) - comedy; Yannis Bezos, Natalia Tsaliki, Ilias Zervos, Memos Begnis
Aliki (2001) - directed by Stratos Markidis; starring Yeoryia Apostolou, Thanassis Efthimiadis, Spyros Kalogyrou
Anatomia enos Eglimatos - terror
Antistrofi Metrisi (Count-Down) (2003) - drama, starring Minas Hatzisavvas, Peggy Stathakopoulou, Krateros Katsoulis, Manos Zaharakos, Katerina Papadaki, Maro Mavri, Rena Kiprioti, Yiorgos Bartis
As Prosehes (2004-2005) - comedy
Cheek to Cheek (1996-1997) - comedy/romance, starring Marianna Toumassatou, Kostas Koklas, Katerina Moutsatsou, Yanka Avayianou, Efi Tsabodimou
Ciao ANT1 - variety show, first hosted by Roula Koromila, then by 
Danda Gia Oles tis Doulies (Nanny for All the Works) (1998-1999) - comedy starring
Danikos Pateras
Di$ Madiam (2006-2007) - comedy, starring Katiana Balanika, Nena Menti, Alexandros Antonopoulos, Sofia Moutidou, Valeria Kouroupi
Dixe mou to filo sou(2005, 2012–13)
Doctor Roulis (Dr.Roulis) (2009) - comedy, starring Haris Romas, Natalia Dragoumi, Tania Trypi, Dimitris Karatzias, Valeria Kouroupi, Theoxaris Ioannidis, Patricia Milik-Peristeri
Eftihismenes Meres (Happy Days) (2004) - drama, starring Giorgos Ninios, Anna Andrianou, Krateros Katsoulis, Anna Michaelou, Anatoli Athanasiadou, Kostas Falelakis, Ioulia Siamou, Mirto Avgerinou, Costantinos Lagos, Giorgos Bartis
Eglimata (Crimes) (1999) - comedy; title features an oldies song, "Little Child" by The Beatles; starring Kostas Koklas, Kaiti Konstantinou, Vassilis Charalambopoulos, Soula Athanasiadou.
Ekdromi - drama/thriller in its first season.
Ekines Kai Ego (Those and Me) (1996-1998) - comedy, starring Yannis Bezos, Niki Sereti, Tasos Kostis, Loukia Pistiola, Yannis Tsikis
Ekpaidevontas ton Mpamph (Babi's Training) (2002-2003) - comedy
Ela N'Agapithoume (Come you Love) (2006) - romantic comedy, starring Labis Livieratos, Nikos Orphanos
 (Greece, Your Sublime) (2003-2005) - comedy, starring Yorgos Partsalakis, Iro Mane, Kostas Koklas, Theodora Siarkou, Alexandros Koliopoulos
Ergazomeni ginaika (Worked Woman) (2008–2010) - comedy
Erotas (Love) (2005–2008) - drama, starring Grigoris Valtinos, Koralia Karanti, Stefanos Kyriakidis, Vasia Panayopoulou, Dimitris Liakopoulos, Manos Papayannis, Yannis Spaliaras, Alexandros Parthenis, Christos Vasilopoulos, Victor Kolasis
Erotas Kleftis (2000) - drama, directed by Manousos Manousakis; starring Stavros Zalmas, Vicky Volioti, Giannis Voglis
Fila to Vatraxo Sou (You Kissed the My Frog) (2007–2009) - comedy, starring Smaragda Karydi
Fili Zois (2002) - directed by Stratos Markidis; starring Georgia Apostolou, Alexandra Palaiologou, Notis Pitsilos, Philippos Sofianos, Stavros Zalmas
Gamos Me Ta Ola Tou (2005) - comedy, starring Alexandros Antonopoulos, Yannis Bezos, Chryssoula Diavati, Petros Filipidis, Pavlos Haikalis, Antonis Kafetzopoulos, Eleni Kastani, Maria Kavoyianni, Mari Konstadatou, Katerina Lehou, Antonis Loudaros, Stelios Mainas, Iro Mane, Ieroklis Michaelidis, Haris Romas, Nikos Sergianopoulos Natalia Tsaliki
Gia mia gynaika ki ena aftokinito (2001) - comedy/romance, directed by Manousos Manousakis; starring Panos Mihalopoulos, Lina Sakka, Yorgos Chraniotis, Zeta Douka, Tasso Kavadia, Christos Makris
Gia Tin Anna (For Anna) (2006) - drama, starring Thanassis Efthimiadis, Ana Dimitrijevic, Nikos Dadinopoulos
 (John the Pretty Boy) (2007) - sketch comedy
Idiaitera Yia Klamata (Notably for Cries) (2000-2002) - comedy starring
I Agapi irthe apo Makria
I Ioanna Tis Kardias (2006) - drama, starring Renia Louizidou
I Mama Teras (1999-2000) - action
I Men Kai I Den (Men & Den) (1993–1996) - comedy, starring Haris Romas, Anna Kouri, Stelios Mainas, Joyce Evidi
I Sirina kai o Batsos (2001–2002) - comedy, starring Mari Konstandatou, Johnny Theodoridis, Vassilis Koukouras, Kostas Evripiotis
I Stavli tis Erietas Zaimi (2002-2004) - comedy set in a women's prison, starring Nikos Sergianopoulos, Mirka Papakonstantinou, Faye Kokkinopoulou, Jessy Papoutsi, Yannis Bostantzoglou, Maria Kanellopoulou, Maria Lekaki
I Varvati (The Tough Guys) (2006) - comedy, starring Tasos Halkias, Stelios Mainas, Gerasimos Gennatas, Giorgos Giannopoulos, Evaggelia Moumouri, Theodora Siarkou, Theodora Voutsa, Christina Koletsa
Iatriko Aporrito (2007-2008) - medical drama
Istories Mystiriou (Mystery Stories) (2006-2007)
Jackpot (1995-1996) - comedy
Kai I Pantremeni Ehoun Psyhi (And Married... you is Soul) (1997–2000) - comedy, starring Antonis Kafetzopoulos, Yorgos Partsalakis, Maria Tsombanaki, Renia Louizidou, Konstadina Mihael, Aspasia Tzitzikaki, Maria Papalambrou, Alexandros Koliopoulos, Karmen Rouggeri
Kalimera Zoi (1994–2005) - long-running soap opera created by Nikos Foskolos; one of the series' most loved characters was Stathis Theoharis, played by Giorgos Vassiliou; the cast changed often
Karabola (Crash)
Kathrefti kathreftaki mou (Mirror Mirror) - comedy (2006), starring Thanasis Veggos and Lina Sakka
Κe … Sera Sera (Que… Sera Sera) (2005) - comedy, starring Yiannis Vouros, Peggy Stathakopoulou
Konstantinou kai Elenis (Konstantinos kai Eleins) (1998–2000) - comedy, starring Haris Romas, Eleni Radou, Vassilis Koukouras, Maria Lekaki, Kalliroi Miriagou, Stergios Nenes
Klemmeni Zoi (2007-2008) - drama
Κryfa Monopatia (Secret Paths) (2005–2006) - drama
Kyrios kai kyria Pels (Mr. and Mrs. Pels) (2009) - comedy
Lampsi (Greek for "shine" or "shining light") (1991–2005) - long-running soap opera from Nikos Foskolos; Hristos Politis was the only actor to play in the series for its entire 15-year run; also starred Katia Dandoulaki
Lefkos Ikos (White House) (2002-2003) - comedy
Lifting (Lifting) (2001) - comedy, starring Haris Romas, Maria Georgiadou, Nikos Alexiou, Diamantis Karanastasis, Natassa Manisalli, Aias Manthopoulos, Aias Manthopoulos, Serafim Silas
 Litsa.com (2008–2010) - comedy
 LOLA (2008-2009) - comedy
Mavros Okeanos (Black Ocean) (1999) - drama, directed by Stratos Markidis; starring Giorgos Ninios, Theofania Papathoma, Niki Sereti, Nikos Psarras, Makis Revmatas Evagelia Seha
Me Agapi Anna (1993–1994) - variety show, hosted by Anna Vissi
Mi Mou Les Antio (2001) - drama, directed by Manousos Manousakis; starring Thalia Matika, Memos Begnis, Yannis Tsimitselis, Anna Tsoukala, Babis Alatzas, Nikos Galanos, Melpo Kosti
Mov - Roz (2005) - drama, starring Marina Psalti, Minas Hatzisavvas
No U Yes - Is Over Serie; Christos Manolis, Kostas Kalamaris, Loutanox Lagadopoulos
O hiros I hira ke ta Hirotera
O Nanos (2001-2003) - comedy
O Polemos ton Astron (Star Wars) - comedy
Oi 3 Fyles (2004) - sketch comedy; KITRINOS DRAKOS-2005 ANT1
Pano apo to nomo
 Paris kai Eleni - comedy
Parto Allios - comedy (2006)
Pater Imon (Our Father) (1995-1996) - starring Kostas Karras, Eleni Menegaki, Efi Oikonomou, Alexandros Rigas, Korina Damoulianou.
Plaka Mou Kanis (2007) - comedy/romance, starring Yorgos Karamihos, Zeta Douka, Kostas Falelakis, Yorgos Kotanidis, Dimitris Kaberidis, Ageliki Spiliopoulou, Dimitris Liolios
 (2006-2007) - black comedy; starring Maria Lekaki, Vladimiros Kyriakidis, Joyce Evidi
Pote den Xeris (2005) - comedy, starring Nena Menti, Minas Hatzisavvas, Yorgos Chraniotis, Anna Stilvi, Katerina Moutsatsou, Valeria Kouroupi
Proklisi (2001) - drama, produced by Stratos Markidis; starring Paschalis Tsarouhas, Vicky Koulianou, Yannis Karatzoyannis, Eleftheria Rigou, Tania Kapsali, Makis Revmatas, Anna Stilvi, Marina Tsintikidou
Prosoxi Markopedio (1999-200) - comedy, hosted by Markos Seferlis
S’ Agapo Gia Panta (I Love you Forever) (2005-2006) - comedy, starring Anna Panayiotopoulou, Tassos Halkias
The Seferlis Show (2000–2001) - comedy, hosted by Markos Seferlis
Ske®tsakia (2006-2007) - sketch comedy, with Maria Bagana, Giannis Drakopoulos, Andriana Halkidi, Giorgos Hatzipavlou, Giorgos Iliopoulos, Ermolaos Mattheos, Nikoletta Ralli, Serafim Silas, Yeoryia Tsagaraki, Emilia Vassilakaki
Solo Kariera (2004-2005)
 Steps - teen drama
Ston Ilio Tou Aegeou (2005-2006) - drama, starring Memos Begnis, Lina Sakka
Strivin dia tou Aravonos
Sun to skylo me ti yata
Ta Filarakia (2002–2003) - comedy, starring Giorgos Konstantinou, Panos Michalopoulos, Bessy Malfa, Jenny Ioakimidou
Ta Maheromata (2004) - comedy/romance, starring Yannis Bezos, Ieroklis Michaelidis, Evaggelia Moumouri, Elias Zervos
 (1994) - comedy/romance, starring Yannis Vouros, Peggy Stathakopoulou, Dimitris Kalivokas, Evelina Papoulia, Hristos Daktylidis
Tha Milisis Me Ton Dikigoro Mou (1992) - comedy/romance, starring Yiannis Bezos, Natalia Tsaliki
Tha Vris Ton Daskalo Sou (2005–2007) - comedy, starring Marios Athanasiou, Evdokia Roumelioti, Sofia Pavlidou, Haris Sozos, Soula Athanasiadou, Sylvia Delikoura
Ti symveni me to Hari
Tihi Vouno (2006-2007) - comedy, starring Pavlos Kontoyannidis, Kleon Gregoriadis, Thomais Androutsou, Thanassis Viskadourakis
Tis Agapis Maheria (The Cut of Love) (2006–2007) - drama, produced by Stratos Markidis; starring Kostas Sommer, Fay Zafirakou, Yiannis Voglis, Spiros Focás
Tis Elladas ta Pedia (1993-1995)
Tmima Ithon (1992-1995) - terror
To kafe tis Haras (Hara's Cafe) - comedy, starring Haris Romas, Renia Louizidou, Joyce Evidi, Gerasimos Skiadaresis
 To Kledei to Parathisou (Paradise's Key) (2007-2008) - drama
To Pehnidi tis Signomis (Sorry Game) (2003-2004) - drama, directed by Manousos Manousakis. (starring Paschalis Tsarouhas, Stelios Petrakis, Stefanos Kyriakidis, Jina Alimonou, Eleana Tahiaou, Zeta Douka
To Pio Glyko Mou Psema (Sweet Lie) - (2002–2004) - comedy/romance, starring Sophia Aliberti, Thanassis Efthimiadis, Kostas Krommidas, Theodora Siarkou, Nikos Orphanos, Valeria Kouroupi, Yannis Tsimitselis
 To soi mou mesa (2009) - comedy
Trikimia (1999) - drama/romance, produced and directed by Stratos Markidis; starring Giorgos Ninios, Yeoryia Apostolou, Thanassis Efthimiadis, Antonis Antoniou, Babis Alatzas, Tania Kapsali
Vammena Kokkina Mallia (Painted Red Hairs) - drama
Varvarotites - comedy, starring Hrysa Ropa, Vladimiros Kyriakidis, Haris Gregoropoulos, Eleni Kastani, Maria Konstadarou
Vodka Portokali (Vodka Orange) (2001–2002) - comedy, starring Kostas Koklas, Renos Haralambidis, Maria Lekaki, Jenny Ioakimidou, Soula Athanasiadou
 Xaibania 3-0 (2000) - sketch comedy; Kitrinos Drakos-2005 ANT1
Xtypokardia Sto Seferli Hills (Heartbeat at Seferly Hills) (2001-2002) - comedy show, hosted by Markos Seferlis
 Xoris Oria - drama
Yaina & Drakos - teen comedy in ATTIKI
Ypografi Priftis (1991) - comedy, starring Pavlos Kontogiannidis, Themis Bazaka, Kostas Triantafyllopoulos, Giorgos Kotanidis
Zevgaria (2002) - drama, starring Giorgos Ninios, Anna Andrianou, Yorgos Chraniotis, Anna Monogiou, Kostas Kazanas, Viki Maragaki, Avgoustinos Remoundos
Ilios (Sun) (2020-2021) - drama

EntertainmentAllaxate Geuseis - cooking show with Alexandros PapandreouAnalyse To - informative program that helps individuals with their personal problems, from phobias, to stress and depression to insecurities; psychologist Sandy Koutsostamati discusses issues that many people in society face and gives practical advice on dealing with these problemsΑuti Ine I Zoi Sou (This is Your Life) - discussion/biographical program examining the lives of famous peopleAxizi Na To Deis (Worth Watching) (September 2006 - June 2010) - showbiz news and discussions about various issues with guests; hosted by Tatiana StefanidouBig BrotherDancing with the Stars (2010-2012,2018-) - Greek version of the American reality showDeal (2006-2011) - gameshow, Greek version of international sensation Deal or No Deal, hosted by Christos FerentinosDon't Tell the Bride (2011) - Greek version of the English reality showEhis Gramma - an emotion-filled show where people are brought together for various purposes: to re-unite with loved ones, to thank someone for their help, to apologize to someone for some previous act committed against them and many others; hosted by Alexandra Kapeletsi; airs Tuesdays at 9pm; previously aired on Alpha TVFame Story - reality TV show; hosts have been Natalia Germanou, Andreas Mikroutsikos, Tatiana Stefanidou and Sophia AlibertiH Lista - gameshow, hosted by Xristos FerentinosKalomeleta Kai Erhete (2006–2009) - weekend variety show, informative and entertaining; reporters travel all around Greece, meeting the people, learning about the area and its history; hosted by Sofia Aliberti and Mihalis MarinosMusic Bee (2006) - music show with Stathis Kavoukis and Julia AlexandratouNext Top Model (2009–2011) - model show, hosted by Vicky KagiaΝyxta Tha Fugoume - satire, a humorous look at the world around us and the issues facing us allO diadoxos tou Uri Geller - magic show, hosted by Cristos Feredinos; special guest Uri GellerO Kalyteros Kerdizi (1994–95) - gameshow, hosted first by Miltos Makridis, then by Giolanda DiamantiO Trohos tis Tyhis - gameshow, Greek version of Wheel of Fortune; first hosted by Terrence Quick, then by Giorgos Polychroniou, then by othersOi Spitogati - variety show, with music, talk, games and more; hosted by Niki Kartsona and Makis PounentisOla 7even - satire, comedy, with Themos AnastasiadisPantevou Sta Fanera - gameshow; contestant select 'their match' by posing various questions and with the help of two friends; the person they select will then accompany them on an unforgettable vacation; similar to The Dating GamePass Pantou - magazine-style show that informs and entertains viewers with news on celebrities, style tips, behind the scenes at the hottest parties, surprises, fascinating travels and much more; hosted by George Satsidis airs Sundays at 5pmThe Real Housewives of Athens (2011) - Greek version of the American reality show
Poios thelei na ginei ekatommyriouchos- Greek version of "Who wants to be a millionaire"-hosted by Grigoris Arnaoutoglou-airs daily at 8pmSuperdeal - gameshow, similar to Deal; aired Sundays at 9pm and prize amounts awarded were greater, up to 500.000 euros; the most expensive gameshow in Greece so far; hosted by Christos FerentinosThisavrofilakio (2001-) - gameshow, hosted by Andreas MikroutsikosTop Chef (2010–2011) - Greek version of the American reality showThe X Factor (2008–2011) - Greek version of the popular UK reality programYour Face Sounds Familiar (2013-2014) - Greek version of the reality showΠάvω ή κάтω - gameshow, Greek version of Card Sharks, hosted by Alkis Tallow

 News and information 

 6 me 10 Mazi - morning show for the weekend; features news, sports, current affairs and more; hosted by George Karameros and Spiros Haritatos2004-4, 2004-3, 2004-2, and 2004-1 - Olympic preview showsApodeixeis (2006-) - current affairs program that discusses issues of importance with the help of invited guests; hosted by Nikos EvangelatosApokalipseis - brings to light the issues of everyday life affecting the public; hosted by Nikos ManeseisEllada@antenna.gr - informative show that airs exclusively on Antenna Satellite and Antenna Pacific'; geared towards the Omogenia, Greeks living abroad and features stories of interest to them; airs infrequentlyEp' Autoforo - current affairs program that discusses issues of importance with the help of invited guests and a panel of expertsKalimera Ellada (Good Morning Greece) (since 1992) - morning programming, hosted by Giorgos PapadakisKalimera Me Ton ANT1 - a quick look at all the local, national and international news headlines, weather forecasts and live reports and discussion on all the top stories; hosted by George KaramerosKokkino Pani (2001 - 200?) - news program, hosted by Pavlos Tsimas, Tasos Telloglou, Yorgos Kouvaras
 Me Ta Matia Tis Ellis (2004–2006) - current affairs show that featured a panel of guests and dealt with issues affecting people in their everyday life; hosted by Elli Stai
 Proinos Kafes - daytime entertainment show that has been on the air for nearly a decade; originally hosted by Eleni Menegaki until 2005; Eleonora Meleti then took over as host until 2008; then hosted by Nikos Moutsinas and Katerina Zarifi from 2008 to 2009
 Radio Arvyla - talk show with a satirical look on current events, based in Thessaloniki and hosted by Αντώνης Κανάκης, Γιάννης Σερβετάς, Στάθης Παναγιωτόπουλος and Χρήστος Κιούσης
 Studio Me Thea - morning show for the weekend; featured news, sports, current affairs and more; aired for seven seasons and was originally hosted by Nikos Manesis, then Spiros Haritatos and Evi FragakiTa Nea tou ANT1 (since 1989) - news, reported by Nikos EvagelatosTa Nea tou ANT1 Cyprus - news, shown on ANT1 Cyprus, Satellite, and PacificTa Nea tou ANT1 Satellite (1994–1999) - news, mainly shown on ANT1 Satellite (English version), reported by Krista Fleischner; total length was about 15 minutesProino ANT1 (ANT1's breakfast) - morning programming, hosted by Yiorgos Papadakis

SportsUEFA Euro 20202022 FIFA World CupGreek Basket League 1996-1998 and 2008-2009UEFA Europa League 2009-2015 Foreign 24AliasAlly McBealBones  Big Bad BeetleborgsCriminal MindsDay BreakDesperate HousewivesDharma & GregDirtGreekGrey's AnatomyKyle XYLas VegasLostLove, Inc.MerlinMiss Match  Mighty Morphin Power RangersPrison BreakPrivate PracticeRoswellSailor MoonFat Dog MendozaWacky World of Tex AveryThe X-FilesAnneMia zoi (One Life)The Slayers VR Troopers  The Magic School BusOtherDragon BallDragon Ball Z - dubbed in Greek; notable for translation mistakes and constant voice changes over characters; aired on Saturday and Sunday early in the morning. Episodes with Greek dub are rare but DeAgostini Hellas has released episodes on DVD called Dragonball Z - H Syllogh (Dragonball Z - The Collection) with Greek dub, and it is now very popular among fans.                           The Simpsons - aired in 2001-02 only; moved to Fox                                 The Young and the Restless - aired from 1991 until 1999, and in 2000 moved to ET1The CutPinkSigns of LifeGirl Number 9''

See also 

List of Greek films

References

Lists of television series by network
Programs
Greek television-related lists